Liberal Democrat Friends of Turkey is a UK-based campaign group promoting support within the British Liberal Democrat Party for a strong bilateral relationship between Britain and Turkey. It also seeks to strengthen the bond between the British Liberal Democrats and the Turkish Liberals, organising meetings in both the UK and Turkey between senior figures.

Liberal Democrats Friends of Turkey promotes active participation in politics and seeks to explain social liberalism and the services that the Liberal Democrats have done, to the citizens of both countries.

The Liberal Democrats work for a society where personal, political and economic liberty are combined with social justice, decentralisation of power and environmental sustainability.

Members of LDFoT

Members of Liberal Democrat Friends of Turkey include: 
Baroness Meral Husseyin Ece OBE, 
Baroness Sarah Ludford, MEP 
Sir Graham Watson, MEP
Jonathan Fryer, 
Andrew Duff OBE, MEP

See also
Liberal Democrats

References

Londra Gazete
Launch
Critical View
LibDem Page

External links
Liberal Democrat Friends of Turkey—Official site 

Organisations associated with the Liberal Democrats (UK)
Political advocacy groups in the United Kingdom
Political organisations based in London